"Someone to Somebody" is a song by Irish singer Feargal Sharkey, which was released in 1985 as the third single from his self-titled debut album. It was written by Geraldine L. Gooden, Michael Torrence, Thomas Gordy and Daniel Kane, and produced by David A. Stewart. The song reached No. 64 in the UK and No. 30 in Ireland.

A music video was filmed to promote the single. The B-side, "Coldwater", was exclusive to the single and is an instrumental written by Sharkey.

Reception
On its release, William Shaw of Smash Hits commented: "Extraordinary really. Through anyone else's vocal cords, this song would remain a corny, overblown bit of nonsense, full to the brim with too many lead guitars and pompous string arrangements. But [Sharkey's] quavering tones have a strange power to change an average song into something out of the ordinary." Betty Page of Record Mirror stated: "Can one actually classify Fearg as A Bona Fide Pop Star? Dash it, why not. Can't say how long it'll last in the light of this yawn-a-second angst ridden epic, which is doubtless a solid track for the album, but hardly a single." Henry Everingham of The Sydney Morning Herald wrote: "As a soloist, one fears that Sharkey could easily sink into mush. "Someone to Somebody" teeters on the edge of this. While the song has some tasteful flute and saxophone solos and terrific harmonies, the howling of "I'm so alone" at the song's end is a bit too much to take."

Formats

Chart performance

Personnel 
 Feargal Sharkey - lead vocals, producer of "Coldwater"
 David A. Stewart - producer of "Someone to Somebody"

References

1986 singles
Feargal Sharkey songs
Pop ballads
1985 songs
Virgin Records singles